Countess Katarzyna Branicka, Katarzyna Potocka, née Branicka Korczak coat of arms (1825–1907) was a Polish noblewoman and art collector. Through her paternal grandmother, Aleksandra Branicka, she was a putative great-grandchild of Catherine the Great. She had two sisters and four brothers, the eldest of whom was the French exile, financier and philanthropist, Count Xavier Branicki.

She married Count Adam Józef Potocki on 26 October 1847 in Dresden. Chopin dedicated his Waltz in A-flat major to her. It was the last waltz by Chopin to be published in his lifetime.
She was said to have been a great beauty and the subject of several portrait artists, including in 1854, the German painter, Franz Winterhalter.

Descendants

Jennah Karthes de Branicka, the German TV Middle East reporter, who also has Lithuanian ancestry, is among the last actual descendants of the Branicki family who are associated with immense wealth and infamy in Polish history.

References

Further reading
 Kenarowa, Halina. Ed. (pl) Maria Kalergi: Listy do Adama Potockiego. (translated from the French by Halina Kenarowa and Róża Drojecka) Warsaw, 1986.

1825 births
1907 deaths
People from Liuboml
People from Volhynian Governorate
Katarzyna
Polish art collectors
Women art collectors
19th-century Polish nobility